Malek Jaziri was the defending champion, but he did not compete that year.
Marcos Baghdatis won the title, beating Michał Przysiężny in the final, 6–1, 4–6, 6–3.

Seeds

Draw

Finals

Top half

Bottom half

References
 Main Draw
 Qualifying Draw

Geneva Open Challenger - Singles
2014 Singles